Time in Malawi is given by a single time zone, officially denoted as Central Africa Time (CAT; UTC+02:00). Malawi does not observe daylight saving time.

IANA time zone database 
In the IANA time zone database, Malawi is given one zone in the file zone.tab – Africa/Blantyre. "MW" refers to the country's ISO 3166-1 alpha-2 country code. Data for Malawi directly from zone.tab of the IANA time zone database; columns marked with * are the columns from zone.tab itself:

See also 
List of time zones by country
List of UTC time offsets

References

External links 
Current time in Malawi at Time.is
Time in Malawi at TimeAndDate.com

Time in Malawi